Kalvin Pearson (born October 22, 1978) is a former American football safety. He was signed by the Cleveland Browns as an undrafted free agent in 2002. He played college football at Grambling.

Early years
Pearson attended Hazlewood High School in Town Creek, Alabama and was a letterman in football.

College career
Pearson attended Grambling State University after transferring from Morehouse College, lettering in football at Grambling.

Professional career
Pearson has also played for the Tampa Bay Buccaneers and Detroit Lions.

External links
Detroit Lions bio
Tampa Bay Buccaneers bio

1978 births
Living people
People from Town Creek, Alabama
Players of American football from Alabama
American football safeties
African-American players of American football
Grambling State Tigers football players
Cleveland Browns players
Frankfurt Galaxy players
Tampa Bay Buccaneers players
Cologne Centurions (NFL Europe) players
Detroit Lions players
Morehouse Maroon Tigers football players
21st-century African-American sportspeople
20th-century African-American sportspeople